Omolade is both a surname and a given name. Notable people with the name include:

Ajibade Omolade (born 1984), Nigerian footballer
Akeem Omolade (born 1983), Nigerian footballer
Omolade Akinremi (born 1974), Nigerian hurdler

See also
Molade